Juan Carlos Zubczuk Miszuk (born March 31, 1965 in Oberá, Misiones) is an Argentine-Peruvian retired professional football goalkeeper. He is of Ukrainian descent.

Club career
He played for Racing Club de Avellaneda in Argentina, he also played for Universitario de Deportes and Alianza Atlético in Peru.

References

External links
 Juan Carlos Zubczuk at BDFA.com.ar 

1965 births
Living people
People from Oberá
Argentine emigrants to Peru
Naturalized citizens of Peru
Argentine people of Ukrainian descent
Peruvian people of Ukrainian descent
Association football goalkeepers
Argentine footballers
Peruvian footballers
Racing Club de Avellaneda footballers
Club Universitario de Deportes footballers
Alianza Atlético footballers
Peruvian Primera División players
1993 Copa América players
Sportspeople from Misiones Province